Mannheimia ruminalis is a bacterium. It is pathogenic.

References

Further reading

Tefera, G., and J. Smola. "Pasteurella haemolytica complex of Pasteurella sensu stricto as new genus Mannheimia: changes in taxonomy."VETERINARNI MEDICINA-PRAHA- 46.4 (2001): 119–124.

External links

LPSN
Type strain of Mannheimia ruminalis at BacDive -  the Bacterial Diversity Metadatabase

Pasteurellales
Bacteria described in 1999